The England national cricket team toured New Zealand in February and March 1988 and played a three-match Test series against the New Zealand national cricket team. The series was drawn 0–0.

Test series summary

First Test

Second Test

Third Test

One Day Internationals (ODIs)

The Rothmans Cup was drawn 2-2.

1st ODI

2nd ODI

3rd ODI

4th ODI

References

1988 in English cricket
1988 in New Zealand cricket
New Zealand cricket seasons from 1970–71 to 1999–2000
1987-88
International cricket competitions from 1985–86 to 1988